William Herbert Dray (23 June 1921, in Montreal – 6 August 2009, in Toronto) was a Canadian philosopher of history. He was Professor Emeritus at the University of Ottawa.

He is known for his version of anti-positivist Verstehen in history, in Laws and Explanation in History, and his work on R. G. Collingwood.

Selected publications 
 Dray, William H. Laws and explanation in history. Oxford University Press, 1957.
Dray, William H. Philosophy of history. Prentice-Hall 1964.
Dray, William H. Holism and individualism in history and social science. 1967.
Dray, William H. 'On the nature and role of narrative in historiography', in History and theory 10.2 (1971): 153–171.
Dray, William H. On history and philosophers of history, vol. 2 of Philosophy of History and Culture, ed. by Krausz, Michael. Brill, 1989.
Dray, William H. History as re-enactment: RG Collingwood's idea of history. Clarendon Press, 1996.

Notes

References
Canadian Encyclopedia page

1921 births
2009 deaths
20th-century Canadian  philosophers
Analytic philosophers
Canadian philosophers
Philosophers of history
Alumni of the University of Oxford
Canadian expatriates in the United Kingdom